Difluoroethene or Difluoroethylene can refer to any one of several isomeric forms of the organochloride with the molecular formula C2H2F2:

There are three isomers:
1,1-Difluoroethene
1,2-Difluoroethene (E and Z)

See also
Difluoroethane
Dichloroethene

Organofluorides
Haloalkenes